Khandaker Rakibul Islam (born 1 January 1956), better known as Rakib, is a retired Bangladeshi footballer who played as a left-back.

Club career
In 1973, Rakib made his debut in the Dhaka League for Mohammedan SC. He went on to become an important member of the Mohammedan team that won the league in both 1975 and 1976. In 1977, he was made club captain during the Aga Khan Gold Cup, at the age of 22. In 1978, Rakib joined arch-rivals Abahani Krira Chakra, and although during his year at the Abahani, he failed to win the league title, Rakib's performance at the 1979 Aga Khan Gold Cup was noteworthy. In 1981, he joined defending league champions Team BJMC, however, his stay at the club was cut short, after BJMC suffered relegation in 1983. He moved to Rahmatganj MFS, and eventually retired while playing for BJMC in 1990.

International career
In 1975, Rakib made it to the Bangladesh U19 squad for the 1975 AFC Youth Championship. The following year, Rakib made his senior international debut for Bangladesh during the 1976 King's Cup, in Bangkok.  German coach Werner Bickelhaupt, selected Rakib in the national team for both the 1978 Asian Games and 1980 AFC Asian Cup qualifiers. However, after veteran defender Monwar Hossain Nannu had his captaincy taken away by the Federation (BFF), Rakib along with five other Abahani players decided not to participate at the 1978 Asian Games in protest. Rakib returned to the team in 1979, to play the AFC qualifiers, and was later selected as the vice-captain for Bangladesh at the main stage of the 1980 AFC Asian Cup, in Kuwait.

After retirement
Since retiring, Rakib has worked for the Bangladesh Football Federation and most recently in 2021, when he assisted a talent hunt program for the BFF Elite Football Academy.

Awards
In 2016, Rakib received the National Sports Award for his decade-long service to Bangladeshi football.

Honours
Mohammedan SC
 Dhaka League = 1975, 1976

Awards and accolades
2016 − National Sports Award.

References 

1974 births
Living people
Footballers from Dhaka
Bangladeshi footballers
Association football fullbacks
Mohammedan SC (Dhaka) players
Abahani Limited (Dhaka) players
Team BJMC players
Rahmatganj MFS players
Bangladesh youth international footballers
Bangladesh international footballers
1980 AFC Asian Cup players
Asian Games competitors for Bangladesh
Recipients of the Bangladesh National Sports Award